Grand Hyatt Dubai is a hotel in the area of Umm Hurair in Dubai, United Arab Emirates established in 2003; at the time its 682 rooms made it the largest hotel in Dubai. The restaurant serves Arabic cuisine. The Grand Hyatt Dubai is one of the Hyatt hotels.

Zabeel is between Dubai Airport and the new developments in Dubai which is usually referred to as "new Dubai".
 
The hotel lobby has an indoor rainforest, which, according to an Economist travel writer, had mixed results in injecting atmosphere.

With more than 8,000 square meters, the hotel has one of the largest hotel convention centers in the city with the largest ballroom being able to host event with up to 2,500 people.

External links
 Grand Hyatt Dubai web site 
 Awtar restaurant website

References

Hotels in Dubai
Hyatt Hotels and Resorts
Hotel buildings completed in 2003